The Barnum Museum is a 1990 collection of fantasy themed short stories by Steven Millhauser. Its closing story is 'Eisenheim the Illusionist', which was filmed in 2006 as The Illusionist.

Short stories 

 A Game of Clue
 Behind the Blue Curtain
 The Barnum Museum
 The Sepia Postcard
 The Eighth Voyage of Sinbad
 Klassik Komix #1
 Rain
 Alice, Falling
 The Invention of Robert Herendeen
 Eisenheim the Illusionist

1990 short story collections
American short story collections
Fantasy short story collections
PEN/Faulkner Award for Fiction-winning works
Poseidon Press books